The Chronicle is a weekly newspaper published in St. Helens, Oregon, United States.

It was established in 1881 and is owned by Country Media. The Chronicle is published on Wednesdays. In 2011, its circulation was 4,372; in 2019 it was 3,459. It is the newspaper of record for Columbia County.

History
When the newspaper started in 1881, it was named the Oregon Mist, later renamed to the St. Helens Mist. In 1933, the Mist bought out the St. Helens Sentinel, which was established in 1926, and the paper was renamed the Sentinel-Mist. In 1936, a paper named the St. Helens Chronicle was started. The Chronicle bought the Sentinel-Mist in 1968 and the combined publication became known as The Sentinel-Mist Chronicle, Columbia County's only newspaper. Later the name became The Chronicle and Sentinel-Mist, finally becoming The Chronicle in 2009.

References

External links
The Chronicle (official website)

1881 establishments in Oregon
Newspapers published in Oregon
Oregon Newspaper Publishers Association
Publications established in 1881
St. Helens, Oregon